The Singhalese Sports Club Cricket Ground (SSC Cricket Ground) is one of the most famous cricket grounds in Sri Lanka, and the headquarters of Sri Lanka Cricket, the controlling body of cricket in Sri Lanka. The ground is sometimes described as "the Lord's of Sri Lanka", It hosts the most domestic finals and is an important international cricket venue. The ground staged its first Test in 1984 against New Zealand and its first One Day International in 1982 against England. The Sri Lankan team has an impressive record here. Out of 38 Tests played at the SSC , Sri Lanka has won 18 matches, and drawn 14, with only 6 losses.

History
In 1899, a combined school cricket team, composed mainly of cricketers from Royal College, S. Thomas' College and Wesley College beat Colts Cricket Club by a one run. A decision was made to form an all-Sinhalese club, and thus Singhalese Sports Club was founded. The club leased land in Victoria Park with sandy soil and covered with cinnamon trees.

In 1952 the club leased another  and moved to its present location in Maitland Place, which had been used as an aerodrome by the allied forces in World War II.

Ground
The pavilion of the ground was built in 1956 with the sponsorship of Donovan Andree, a leading nightclub entrepreneur. A giant scoreboard and sightscreens were built in the mid-70s. Later the current scoreboard was built. The ground also has a media center and commentary box with modern facilities. Various sponsors including Lankabell, Seylan Bank and HSBC have built stands bearing their brands. There are two grass embankments for the spectators.

Highlights
In 1992 Australian tour of Sri Lanka, Sri Lanka lost the SSC Test match to Australia by 16 runs after being set a target of only 181 runs. This is one of Sri Lanka's narrowest defeats in Test cricket. Shane Warne took three wickets in thirteen balls; this was his first notable performance in Test cricket.

In the 2001–02 Asian Test Championship, Mohammed Ashraful of Bangladesh become the youngest cricketer to score a Test hundred, one day before his 17th birthday. However Bangladesh went on to lose the match by an innings and 137 runs.

Chaminda Vaas took 8 wickets for 19 runs in 2001–02 against Zimbabwe, the best bowling performance in a One Day International match. The Zimbabwean total of 38 was the lowest team innings total in ODIs at that point of time.

Kumar Sangakkara and Mahela Jayawardene shared a partnership of 624 runs against South Africa in 2006–07 season, the highest partnership for any wicket in Test and first class cricket.

Ground Figures

Key

 P Matches Played
 H Matches Won by Home Side
 T Matches Won by Touring Side
 N Matches Won by Neutral Side
D/N/T Matches Drawn/No Result/Tied

Updated 26 July 2018

World Cup Cricket

1996 Cricket World Cup

ICC Champions Trophy Cricket

The 2002 ICC Champions Trophy was held in Sri Lanka. Six group matches played in SSC. Other matches played in R. Premadasa Stadium.

2002 ICC Champions Trophy

See also
List of Test cricket grounds
List of international cricket centuries at the Sinhalese Sports Club Ground
List of international cricket five-wicket hauls at the Sinhalese Sports Club Ground

References

External links
Cricinfo SSC ground profile
SSC website
 CricketArchive

Cricket grounds in Colombo
Sport in Colombo
Test cricket grounds in Sri Lanka
1952 establishments in Ceylon